The 1901 Iowa Hawkeyes football team was an American football team that represented the University of Iowa in the 1901 Western Conference football season. In its fourth season under head coach Alden Knipe, the team compiled a 6–3 record (0–3 against conference opponents) and was outscored by a total of 115 to 85. Clyde Williams was the team captain.

The team's loss to Minnesota on October 26 ended a 23-game unbeaten streak dating back to November 1898.

Schedule

References

Iowa
Iowa Hawkeyes football seasons
Iowa Hawkeyes football